Heterodox teaching is a concept in the law of the People's Republic of China (PRC) and its administration regarding new religious movements and their suppression. Also translated as "cults" or "evil religions", "heterodox teachings" are defined in Chinese law as organizations and religious movements that either fraudulently use religion to carry out other illegal activities, deify their leaders, spread "superstition" to confuse or deceive the public, or "disturb the social order" by harming people's lives or property. What exactly these definitions mean has been interpreted in various ways since their establishment in 1999/2000. Organizations that are found by local police forces in the PRC to be distributing heterodox teachings are targeted for disruption, and its leaders and organizers are severely prosecuted.

The current law regarding heterodox teachings was established by the Standing Committee of the National People's Congress (NPCSC) in October 1999, based in part on an earlier law from November 1995. A few months later, in April 2000, the Ministry of Public Security published its own guidance on what constituted a heterodox teaching organization, how they would be addressed, and a list and description of 14 religious organizations identified as organizations for suppression (included below). These movements were directly compared to the historical religious movements the White Lotus and the Red Lantern Sect, both widely regarded as cults.

One religious movement that has been consistently targeted is Falun Gong, defined as a "Qigong organization". The passage of the heterodox teachings laws are widely viewed as part of the overall campaign for the persecution of Falun Gong in the PRC. The persecution has drawn condemnation from governments worldwide, with 921 lawmakers and political figures signing a statement in 2020 calling it a "systematic and brutal campaign to eradicate the spiritual discipline of Falun Gong”.

Passage of law
On 30 October 1999, the Standing Committee of the National People’s Congress passed the “Decision on Banning Heretical Organizations and Preventing and Punishing Heretical Activities”, which called for a crackdown on “heretical organizations such as Qigong and other forms”, and also applied retroactively to Qigong practitioners.

On the same day, the Supreme People’s Court and the Supreme People’s Procuratorate issued a joint judicial interpretation named, “Explanation on Questions Concerning the Concrete Application of Laws Handling Criminal Cases of Organizing and Making Use of Heretical Organizations”. The interpretation reads: The offenses of establishing or using sects to organize, scheme, carry out and instigate activities of splitting China, endangering the reunification of China or subverting the country’s socialist system should be handled according to relevant laws on endangering State security offenses, as stipulated in the Criminal Law.

2000 Ministry of Public Security list

The following 14 organizations and movements were specifically named in the 2000 list of heterodox teachings published by the Ministry of Public Security. This list articulated different organizations that the Ministry had investigated or been involved in the suppression of since at least 1983. The first seven groups on the list were organizations identified by the Central Committee of the Chinese Communist Party and the State Council, while the second group of seven organizations were identified directly by the ministry. A feature of some, but not all, of the Christian organizations on this list is that their leaders claim to be the second coming of Christ or some other kind of unique church authority.

Organizations identified by the Central Committee and the State Council
"The Shouters", a Christian movement broadly defined as organizations founded or inspired by Witness Lee, suppressed since 1983 and classified as a heterodox teaching since 1995.
Mentuhui, a Christian movement founded by Ji Sanbao, classified as a heterodox teaching since 1995.
All Ranges Church, a Christian house church organization founded by Peter Xu, classified since 1995.
Spirit Church (China), identified as the "Lingling Sect", a Christian sect founded by Hua Xuehe, classified since 1995.
New Testament Church (founded by Hong Kong actress Mui Yee and based in Hong Kong and Taiwan, classified since 1995.
Guanyin Famen, also organized as Yuan Dun Famen, a sect of Mahayana Buddhism founded by Ching Hai, currently organized as a cybersect, classified since 1995.
Zhushenjiao, founded by Liu Jiaguo (a former member of the Shouters and Beili Wang) in 1993, classified as a heterodox teaching since 1998.

Organizations identified by the Ministry of Public Security

Other groups recognized before 2012 
In addition to the fourteen groups listed above, scholar Edward A. Irons noted an additional eight organizations identified as xiéjiào groups in various governmental lists and edicts issued before Xi Jinping succeeded Hu Jintao as General Secretary of the Chinese Communist Party in 2012, for a total of 22 groups. Those additional groups are:

 The Church of Almighty God, also known as Eastern Lightning, a Christian sect founded by Zhao Weishan in 1989, identified as a heterodox teaching organization in 1995.
 , a Christian sect founded in 1994 by Wang Yongmin, identified as xiéjiào in 1995.
 Bloody Holy Spirit, a Christian sect founded  in Taiwan in 1988 by Zuo Kun, identified as xiéjiào in 1996.
 Falun Gong, a qigong group founded in 1992 by Li Hongzhi, identified as xiéjiào in 1999.
 Yuandun Famen, a branch of Guanyin Famen Buddhism listed above but occasionally recognized as a separate organization, identified as xiéjiào in 1999.
 Zhong Gong, a qigong group established in 1987 by Zhang Hongbao, identified as xiéjiào in 2000.
 South China Church, a Christian sect founded in 1990 by Gong Shengliang and descended from the All Ranges Church identified above, identified as xiéjiào in 2001.
 Pure Land Learning Association, a Buddhist sect founded in Taiwan in 1984 by Chin Kung, identified as xiéjiào in 2011.

2017 designation of "dangerous organizations" 
On September 18 2017, a new government xiéjiào website listed a total of 20 groups (all of the 22 groups listed above, but with the notable exceptions of Zhong Gong and the Pure Land Learning Association, whose omission is the cause of some speculation), eleven of whom were identified as "dangerous", as opposed to the nine groups receiving the lesser warning to "be on guard" against them. These eleven groups were:

 Falun Gong
 The Church of Almighty God
 The Shouters
 Mentuhui
 Unification Church
 Guanyin Famen
 Bloody Holy Spirit
 All Ranges Church
 Sanban Puren Pai
 True Buddha School
 Mainland China Administrative Deacon Station

See also
 Freedom of religion in China
 Antireligious campaigns in China
 Governmental lists of cults

References

Further reading

External links
 "The crackdown on Falun Gong and other so-called 'heretical organizations'", Amnesty International, March 23 2000

Cults
East Asian religions
Religion in China
Human rights in China
Falun Gong
Persecution of Christians
Religious persecution by communists
Government opposition to new religious movements
Chinese cults